Felipe Cristian Miranda Arellano (born May 10, 1986) is a Chilean professional Water-skier who has represented his country in two Pan American Games winning one silver and 3 bronze medals. Felipe won three golds at the first Bolivarian Beach Games.

Personal life
Felipe is the younger brother of Rodrigo Miranda, also a professional Water-skier. Both brothers dominate the South American circuit.

References

External links
 Bolivarian Beach Games Profile

Living people
1986 births
Place of birth missing (living people)
Pan American Games gold medalists for Chile
Pan American Games silver medalists for Chile
Pan American Games bronze medalists for Chile
Pan American Games medalists in water skiing
Water skiers at the 2015 Pan American Games
South American Games gold medalists for Chile
South American Games silver medalists for Chile
South American Games medalists in water skiing
Competitors at the 2014 South American Games
Water skiers at the 2011 Pan American Games
Water skiers at the 2007 Pan American Games
Water skiers at the 2019 Pan American Games
Medalists at the 2007 Pan American Games
Medalists at the 2011 Pan American Games
Medalists at the 2015 Pan American Games
Medalists at the 2019 Pan American Games
21st-century Chilean people